Quintessence is the second studio album by the English group Quintessence.

Track listing
All tracks composed by Quintessence; except where noted.
Side one
 "Jesus, Buddha, Moses, Gauranga" - 5:01
 "Sea of Immortality" - 5:19
 "High on Mt. Kailash (Excerpt From Opera)" (lyrics: Stanley Barr) - 5:51
 "Burning Bush (Live)" - 2:35
 "Shiva's Chant" - 2:13

Side two
 "Prisms (Conception Barham)" - 3:12
 "Twilight Zones" (lyrics: Stanley Barr) - 5:18
 "Maha Mantra" - 1:37
 "Only Love" - 3:54
 "St. Pancras (Live)" - 6:19
 "Infinitum (Conception Barham)" - 1:42

CD bonus tracks
 "Jesus, Buddha, Moses, Gauranga" - 5:08 (live version)

Personnel
Quintessence
 Sambhu Babaji - bass guitar
 Maha Dev - rhythm guitar
 Shiva Shankar Jones - vocals, keyboards 
 Jake Milton - drums
 Allan Mostert - lead guitar
 Raja Ram - flute
with:
John Barham - arrangements, musical director
Technical
Richard Polak - front cover photography
Gopala - paintings

References 

1970 albums
Quintessence (English band) albums
Island Records albums